Adolf Goetzberger (29 November 1928 – 24 February 2023) was a German physicist.

Life and career 
Goetzberger studied physics in Munich, Germany. He finished his university studies with a work over Über die Kristallisation aufgedampfter Antimonschichten. He worked together with William Shockley in Palo Alto, California and for company Bell Labs.  In 1981, Goetzberger founded Fraunhofer Institute for Solar Energy Systems ISE in Freiburg im Breisgau.

Goetzberger died on 24 February 2023, at the age of 94.

Awards 
 J J Ebers Award
 European Inventor Award
 Doctor honoris by University of Freiburg, 1971
 Honorary doctorate from the Faculty of Science and Technology at Uppsala University, Sweden, 1995
 Karl Boer medal, 1997
 Becquerel Prize, 1997
 William R. Cherry Award, 1997
 Einstein Award, 2006
 European Solar Award, 2009 
 Officers Cross of the Order of Merit of the Federal Republic of Germany
 Order of Merit of Baden-Württemberg

References

External links 
 Fraunhofer Institute for Solar Energy Systems ISE: Solarpionier und Gründer des Fraunhofer ISE feiert 83. Geburtstag
 Agrivoltaic

1928 births
2023 deaths
20th-century German  physicists
21st-century German physicists
People associated with solar power
Officers Crosses of the Order of Merit of the Federal Republic of Germany
Recipients of the Order of Merit of Baden-Württemberg
Scientists from Munich
German expatriates in the United States